Alexander Ernesto Aravena Guzmán (born 6 September 2002) is a Chilean professional footballer who plays as a forward for Chilean club Universidad Católica.

Club career

Universidad Catolica
Aravena debuted the year 2020 in the match against Huachipato in San Carlos de Apoquindo, on the following date.

International career
He represented Chile at under-23 level in a 1–0 win against Peru U23, where he scored the goal, on 31 August 2022, in the context of preparations for the 2023 Pan American Games.

Career statistics

Club

Honours

Club
Universidad Católica

Primera División de Chile: 2020, 2021
 Supercopa de Chile: 2020, 2021

References

External links
 

2002 births
Living people
Footballers from Santiago
Chilean footballers
Chile youth international footballers
Association football forwards
Chilean Primera División players
Club Deportivo Universidad Católica footballers
Ñublense footballers